Wassim Béji (born February 25, 1977, in Paris) is a French film producer.

Filmography
 De retour, (short, 2005)
 Hell, (2005)
 24 Bars, (2007)
 Asylum Blackout, (2011)
 Headwinds, (2011)
 Amitiés sincères, (2011)
 Yves Saint Laurent, (2014)
 A Perfect Man, (2015)
 Iris, (2016)
 Based on a True Story, (2017)
 Burn Out, (2017)
 Mr. Know-It-All, (2018)
 Terrible Jungle, (2020)
 Kandisha, (2020)
 Black Box, (2021)

References

1977 births
Living people
French film producers